Asgharabad (also Romanized as Aşgharābād) is a village in Manjilabad Rural District, in the Central District of Robat Karim County, Tehran Province, Iran. At the 2006 census, its population was 509, in 124 families.

References 

Populated places in Robat Karim County